Trent Knobel (born 23 May 1980) is a former Australian rules footballer in the Australian Football League.

Knobel, a ruckman originally from the Gold Coast, was recruited to the AFL in his home state with the Brisbane Lions onto their rookie list. He made his debut in 2000 after a rookie elevation. After getting his chance in Round 14, Knobel held his spot for much of the season, and played in two finals matches.

After a disappointing 2001 season, and with the Lions having an abundance of ruck stocks (Keating, McLaren, McDonald, Macdonald among others), they traded him to St Kilda.

After fairly limited seasons with the Saints in 2002 and 2003, his 2004 season was much improved, playing all 24 games and becoming the Saints' number one ruckman. Despite his crash and bash ruckwork and tally of 460 hitouts for the year, he was criticised for his lack of around the ground work, averaging just 6 disposals in 2004.

This led to him being delisted by St Kilda, before being selected in the 2005 pre-season draft by the Richmond Football Club. In 2005, he missed 3 games late in the year with a hamstring injury but performed better around the ground.

In 2006, Knobel played just 3 games and found it hard for selection due to the form of ruckman Troy Simmonds.  Due to ongoing injury concerns Knobel was unable to play a senior game in 2007 and announced his retirement from AFL football on 28 August 2007.

Post AFL career
After his AFL retirement, Trent Knobel decided to join AFLQ club Labrador Tigers. In 2015 he joined Maffra Football Club, winning the Gippsland Football League premiership with them in 2016.

References

External links

1980 births
Living people
Brisbane Lions players
Richmond Football Club players
St Kilda Football Club players
Broadbeach Australian Football Club players
Sportspeople from the Gold Coast, Queensland
Australian rules footballers from Queensland
Labrador Australian Football Club players
Southport Australian Football Club players